(born July 16, 1985), is a Japanese actor from Osaka Prefecture.

Selected filmography

TV drama
Doremisora (2002)
Journey Under the Midnight Sun (2006)
Ryōmaden (2010), Itō Shunsuke
Carnation (2011)
Hana Moyu (2015)
 Jimmy (2018), Shoji Murakami
 Segodon (2018), Ōkuma Shigenobu
 Scarlet (2020)
 Gift of Fire (2020)
 Detective Yuri Rintaro (2020), Keiichi Ide
 Reach Beyond the Blue Sky (2021), Hara Ichinoshin

Unknown date
When the Last Sword Is Drawn
Teru Teru Kazoku
Medaka
Shin Akakabu Kenji Funsenki
Piano
Tsunagareta Asu
Future Amusement Park
Hatsukoi net.com
Rookies

Film
The Letters (2006)
Sway (2006)
Love Exposure (2009)
The Master of Funerals (2019)
Gift of Fire (2021)
The Voice of Sin (2020)
Asakusa Kid (2021), Hachirō Azuma
 Roleless (2022)

Unknown date
School Wars
Pacchigi!
Oyayubi Sagashi
Night Picnic
Rainbow Song
Awa Dance
Sakigake!! Otokojuku

References

External links
Hiroyuki Onoue at Dongyu Club

1985 births
Japanese male child actors
Japanese male film actors
Japanese male television actors
Living people
Male actors from Osaka Prefecture
People from Ibaraki, Osaka
20th-century Japanese male actors
21st-century Japanese male actors